Sountli village Situated in Tehsil Shahzadpur Tehsil in Ambala District of Haryana State, India.It is located 26 km towards East from District headquarters Ambala. 3 km from Shahzadpur.  47 km from State capital Chandigarh.

Demographics 
Sountli has total 1356 families residing. Sountli Village has population of 1,255 of which 50.4% (633) are males and 49.6% (622) Female as per Population Census 2011. Total Literacy rate is 68.0% (854) and Female Literacy rate is 30.4% (381), Scheduled Tribes Population 0% and Scheduled Caste Population is 32.7% (410).

Schools & Colleges
 Primary School 0 km
 Maa Bhagwati Niketan Public School, Shahzadpur 3.2 km
 Govt Sen Sec School Shahzadpur 4.5 km
 Govt. girls school Shahzadpur 4.5 km
 M.R.S.D. Senior Secondary School, 4.0 km
 GOVT COLLEGE FOR GIRLS, Naraingarh Road, Baragarh 8.3 km
 Icl Institute Of Management & Technology, Shahzadpur Naraingarh, Ambala, 5.0 km
 ICL Institute of Architecture, Sountli, 700M
 A.R.I. - SHAPE Rasidpur Campus for AFF/PSCRB, Dhanana-Jatwar Kaccha Rd, 6.6 km
 New Universal College Of Education, Ballopur, 13.2 km
 E-Max College of Education, Kalpi-Naraingarh Road, Village Gola, Mullana, Ambala 14.3 km

Nearby villages 
Pathreri 6 km, Khurd 2.4 km, Nagal 8.4 km, Dhamauli Uparli 10.6 km, Dhamauli Bichli 10.7 km, Karasan 10.9 km, Ganeshpur 12.1 km, Santokhi 12.9 km, Babak Majra 8.6 km, Korwa Khurd 7.4 km, Gharouli Narayangarh, Gharbuli 10.1 km, Behloli 7.8 km, Nasdoli 10.6 km,

Nearby Cities
Shahzadpur 4.5 km, Naraingarh 15.7 km, Saha 35 km, Ambala District Headquarter 26.9 km, Barwala 22.7 km, Mullana 28.6 km, Raipur Rani21.4 km, Chandigarh 51.3 km, Dhin 34.4 km, New Delhi 230 km,

Nearby Masjids, Mandirs and Gurudawaras

Nearby Industry
 Venkys India Ltd Sountli, Haryana Distance-300M
 Shree Ganesh Pipes Indl Sountli. Distance-500m

Nearby Banks
 State Bank of India, Pathreri , Haryana Distance-2.5 km 
 State Bank of India, Shahzadpur, Haryana Distance-2.6 km
 Punjab & Sind Bank, Shahzadpur, Haryana Distance-3.6 km
 HDFC Bank LTD, Ambala Rd, Shahzadpur, Haryana Distance-3.3 km
 Punjab National Bank ATM, Ambala-Dehradun-Haridwar Rd, Shahzadpur, Haryana Distance-3.1 km
 Axis Bank, Khewat No 108, Ground Floor Kh No 9//20/2, 3/5, Ambala - Naraingarh Road, Banaundi, Haryana Distance-3.9 km 
 Axis bank, Dhanana Rd, Dhanana, Haryana Distance-4.0 km

References

Cities and towns in Ambala district
Tourism in Haryana
Forts in Haryana
Hindu temples in Haryana
Ambala district
Villages in Ambala district